Deepdale Street railway station was the original Preston terminus of the Preston and Longridge Railway in Lancashire, England, when it first opened in 1840. It was located in Deepdale Street, off Deepdale Road, on what was then the outskirts of Preston.  The rail line was originally designed to carry quarried stone from Longridge to Preston, so the passenger facilities were quite rudimentary and there were many sidings near the station for unloading stone.

Deepdale Street was closed to passengers but continued to be used for goods, even long after the rest of the line had closed. A coal depot in Deepdale Street, served by the railway, did not close until the 1990s.

Tracks connecting Deepdale Street to the West Coast Main Line via Miley Tunnel still exist although they are now rusty and overgrown.

References 

 Suggitt, G. (2003, revised 2004) Lost Railways of Lancashire, Countryside Books, Newbury, pp. 49–53.
 Till, J.M. (1993) A History of Longridge and its People, Carnegie Publishing, Preston, 

Disused railway stations in Preston
Former Preston and Longridge Railway stations
Railway stations in Great Britain opened in 1840
Railway stations in Great Britain closed in 1856